The Egypt national under-16 and under-17 basketball team is a national basketball team of Egypt, governed by the Egyptian Basketball Federation. It represents the country in international under-16 and under-17 (under age 16 and under age 17) basketball competitions.

The team was crowned as the champion of the 2019 FIBA Under-16 African Championship in Cape Verde.

World Cup record

Current roster

See also
Egypt national under-19 basketball team
Egypt women's national under-17 basketball team
Egypt men's national basketball team

References

External links

Archived records of Egypt team participations

Men's national under-17 basketball teams
Basketball